The 2017–18 Russian Cup was the 26th season of the Russian football knockout tournament since the dissolution of Soviet Union.

The competition started on 14 July 2017 and finished on 9 May 2018. The winners, FC Tosno, could have earned a spot in the 2018–19 UEFA Europa League group stage, but did not obtain the UEFA license and was closed a month later due to financial problems.

Representation of clubs in leagues
 Russian Premier League: 16 clubs;
 Russian Football National League: 18 clubs;
 Russian Professional Football League: 57 clubs;
 Russian Amateur Football League: 3 clubs: Dynamo Kostroma, Zvezda Saint Petersburg, Metallurg Asha;
 Russian Regional League: 2 clubs: FC Belogorsk, FC Delin Izhevsk;
 Total: 96 clubs.

First round
West and Centre

Ural-Povolzhye

South

Second round
East

West and Centre

Ural-Povolzhye

South

Third round
East

West and Center

Ural–Povolzhye

South

Fourth round
FNL clubs entered at this stage (except for FC Zenit-2 Saint Petersburg and FC Spartak-2 Moscow).

Round of 32

Teams from the Premier League entered the competition at this round. The matches were played on 20 and 21 September 2017.

Round of 16
The matches were played on 25 October 2017.

Quarter-finals
The matches were played on 27 February, 28 February and 4 April 2018.

Semi-finals
The matches were played on 18 April 2018.

Final
The final match was played on 9 May 2018.

References

External links
 Official page 

Russian Cup seasons
Cup
Russian Cup